The Government Reinaldo Azambuja began on January 1, 2015, and will end on December 31, 2022, Reinaldo Azambuja was elected in 2014 as the 11th governor of Mato Grosso do Sul, defeating candidate Delcídio do Amaral. Azambuja was re-elected governor in the following election, in the second election he defeated Odilon de Oliveira.

Of the 24 promises made by Reinaldo Azambuja, he fulfilled 14 according to the government of Mato Grosso do Sul, with a rate of 58%, more than double the national average, which was 26%. The second best performance was from the governor of Ceará, Camilo Santana, with 47%, followed by Renato Casagrande, from Espírito Santo, who fulfilled 44% of his promises.

In the two and a half years of his second term, Azambuja as governor of Mato Grosso do Sul increased the number of full-time schools. In 2018 there were 29, and increased to 97 in July 2021. In addition, the offer of scholarships in the Vale Universidade Indígena programs was increased from 1,800 in 2018 to 2,000 in 2021. And the Bolsa Atleta and Bolsa Técnico, from 170 in 2018 to 265 in the year 2021.

Cabinet

First teit 
In his first term, Reinaldo Azambuja's cabinet was made up of the following secretaries:

     PSDB (8) /       Independent (3) /       PPS (1)

Second term 
In his second term, Reinaldo Azambuja's cabinet was made up of the following secretaries:

     PSDB (6) /       Independent (3) /       DEM (1)

References 

Tenures in political office by individual
2010s in Brazil
2020s in Brazil